The 2015 Intermediate League World Series took place from August 2–8 in Livermore, California, United States. Seoul, South Korea defeated Wellington, Florida in the championship game.

Teams

Results

United States Bracket

International Bracket

Consolation Round

Elimination Round

References

Intermediate League World Series
Intermediate League World Series